Jonathan Thomas Cleveland (born December 19, 1970) is a former competition swimmer and breaststroke specialist who was born in the United States and competed for Canada at three Summer Olympics, starting in 1988.

Four years later he won the bronze medal with the Canadian team in the men's 4x100-metre medley relay, together with Mark Tewksbury, Marcel Gery and Stephen Clarke.  His best individual performance was the seventh place, at the 1988 Summer Olympics in Seoul, in the 200-metre breaststroke.

Cleveland won gold medals in the men's 200-metre breaststroke and 4x100-metre medley relay at the 1990 Commonwealth Games.  He became the head swim coach at Newman Smith High School, and later at Ranchview High School, located in Texas.

Cleveland is the son of former Major League Baseball pitcher Reggie Cleveland.

Cleveland now resides in Texas with his wife and three children.

See also
 List of Commonwealth Games medallists in swimming (men)
 List of Olympic medalists in swimming (men)

References

1970 births
Sportspeople from Fresno, California
Olympic swimmers of Canada
Swimmers at the 1988 Summer Olympics
Swimmers at the 1990 Commonwealth Games
Swimmers at the 1992 Summer Olympics
Swimmers at the 1994 Commonwealth Games
Swimmers at the 1995 Pan American Games
Swimmers at the 1996 Summer Olympics
Olympic bronze medalists for Canada
Canadian male breaststroke swimmers
Living people
Olympic bronze medalists in swimming
Medalists at the 1992 Summer Olympics
Commonwealth Games gold medallists for Canada
Commonwealth Games silver medallists for Canada
Commonwealth Games bronze medallists for Canada
Pan American Games silver medalists for Canada
Pan American Games bronze medalists for Canada
Commonwealth Games medallists in swimming
Pan American Games medalists in swimming
Medalists at the 1995 Pan American Games
Medallists at the 1990 Commonwealth Games
Medallists at the 1994 Commonwealth Games